Maksim Viktorovich Tishkin (born on 11 November 1989) is a Russian professional football player. He plays as a right back for FC Baltika Kaliningrad.

Club career
He made his Russian Premier League debut for FC Ufa on 3 August 2014 in a game against FC Kuban Krasnodar.

External links
 
 

1989 births
People from Lyambirsky District
Sportspeople from Mordovia
Living people
Russian footballers
Association football defenders
FC Mordovia Saransk players
FC Spartak Kostroma players
FC Ufa players
FC Tom Tomsk players
FC Baltika Kaliningrad players
FC SKA-Khabarovsk players
Russian Premier League players
Russian First League players
Russian Second League players